Gold is a 1934 German science fiction film directed by Karl Hartl. The film involves a British scientist who is attempting to create a device that turns base materials into gold. He later forces the German scientist's assistant Werner Holk (Hans Albers), who was working on a similar experiment, to come to his underwater nuclear reactor to help him. Gold was made in both German-language and French-language versions with Brigitte Helm reprising her role in both.

Plot
A German scientist has discovered a theoretical means of transforming lead into gold. Working with his engineer Werner Holk (Hans Albers), he is literally moments from proving his theory when the lab is blown up by a saboteur. Holk is then hired by the British capitalist who ordered the sabotage and goes to Scotland to see his friend's work recreated on a massive scale in a secret laboratory beneath the North Sea. Swearing revenge, he agrees to help the millionaire and even fraudulently "creates" a bit of gold to fortify the illusion that the machine works. Gaining the confidence of the millionaire's somewhat wayward daughter Florence (Brigitte Helm) as well as the workers, Holk puts together a plan to destroy the machine before the artificial gold it would create can wreak havoc on the world economy. The first day of the machine's operation, Holk manages to turn the workers against the millionaire (thus ensuring they'll all get away safely), then only barely escapes himself before the lab is blown up in a spectacular sequence of explosions and strobe lighting.

Production
Director Karl Hartl developed Gold after the international success of his previous science fiction film Der Tunnel. Gold was the studio Universum Film AG's superproduction of that time and reportedly took 14 months to shoot. Actor Hans Albers sued the production asking for nearly double his salary but lost the case. During this production time, a French-language version of the film was also made which kept Brigitte Helm as the lead actress but changed many of the supporting characters roles. L'Or was the French-language version of the film that was shot simultaneously with it. Serge de Poligny directed the scenes in French with the script adapted to French by Jacques Thierry.

Cast

German-language version
 Hans Albers as Werner Holk
 Brigitte Helm as Florence Wills
 Michael Bohnen as John Wills
 Lien Deyers as Margit Möller
 Friedrich Kayßler as Prof. Achenbach
 Ernst Karchow as Lüders
 Eberhard Leithoff as Harris
 Willi Schur as Pitt
 Hans-Joachim Büttner as Becker
 Walter Steinbeck as Brann
 Heinz Wemper as Vesitsch
 Rudolf Platte as Schwarz
 Heinz Salfner as Direktor Sommer
 Erich Haußmann as Sekretär

French-language version
 Brigitte Helm as Florence Wills
 Pierre Blanchar as François Berthier
 Roger Karl as John Wills
 Rosine Deréan as Hélène
 Louis Gauthier as Lefèvre
 Jacques Dumesnil as Malescot
 Marc Valbel as Harris
 Robert Goupil as Le journaliste
 Pierre Piérade as un domestique
 Raoul Marco as O'Kelly

Release
Gold premiered in Berlin at the Ufa-Palast am Zoo theater on 29 March 1934. The French-language version was shown on 1 June 1934. When the film was reviewed by the Allied Censorship boards after World War II, the viewers pondered whether German scientists had been able to build a nuclear reactor long before it was originally thought they did. Parts of the stock footage scenes in Gold were later used again in the 1953 American film The Magnetic Monster.

Reception
In 1934, the New York Times gave the film a positive review stating "So well is this mixture of pseudo science, love and near-love photographed that persons ignorant of German need have no fear of inability to follow the action of "Gold" and "the audience is kept interested in the steps leading up to the dénouement, despite the inordinate length of the film." Wonder Stories praised Gold as "a masterful scientifilm fantasy". Film Daily declared the film to be an "Entertaining drama [...] has good cast and is essentially interesting form the technical angle."

Variety reviewed the French-language L'Or stating that the film "depends for is effect on sensational machinery - a Frankenstein electric machine to make synthetic gold - and such makes a certain impression.... Aside from that, pic is commonplace."

See also
 List of German films of 1933–1945
 List of science-fiction films of the 1930s

Notes

Sources

External links

Gold at Virtual History

1934 films
1934 multilingual films
1930s science fiction films
Films of Nazi Germany
1930s German-language films
German science fiction films
German black-and-white films
Films directed by Karl Hartl
German multilingual films
Films set in Berlin
UFA GmbH films
1930s German films